Mariyampillai Antony Jeyanathan (11 May 1948 – 1 October 2016) was a Sri Lankan Tamil teacher, politician and provincial councillor.

Jeyanathan was born on 11 May 1948. He was the son of Mariyampillai and Mary Theresa. He was educated at Mullaitivu Maha Vidyalayam.

Jeyanathan was a teacher and served as a school principal before becoming a director of education.

Jeyanathan contested the 2013 provincial council election as one of the Tamil National Alliance's candidates in Mullaitivu District and was elected to the Northern Provincial Council. After the election he was appointed to assist the Chief Minister on social services and rehabilitation. He took his oath as provincial councillor in front of Chief Minister C. V. Vigneswaran at Veerasingam Hall on 11 October 2013. He was elected unopposed as Deputy Chairman of the Northern Provincial Council at its inaugural meeting on 25 October 2013.

On the morning of 1 October 2016 Jeyanathan was riding a motorbike near Mulliyawalai when he fell off the bike following a suspected heart attack. He was taken to Mullaitivu Hospital (Mancholai Base Hospital) but was pronounced dead on arrival.

References

1948 births
2016 deaths
Illankai Tamil Arasu Kachchi politicians
Members of the Northern Provincial Council
People from Northern Province, Sri Lanka
Sri Lankan Tamil civil servants
Sri Lankan Tamil politicians
Sri Lankan Tamil teachers
Tamil National Alliance politicians